Vignesh may refer to:

Vignesh (actor) (born 1968), Indian actor
Vignesh Karthick, Tamil television actor
Gunashekar Vignesh (born 1988), Indian footballer
Ganapathi Vignesh (born 1981), Indian cricketer
RJ Vigneshkanth, Tamil comedian

See also
Vignesh, another name for the Hindu deity Ganesha